Mattafix were an English electronic duo, consisting of vocalist Marlon Roudette and producer and keyboardist Preetesh Hirji. Their sound was a fusion of hip hop, R&B, reggae, dancehall, blues, jazz, soul and world. Known for their 2005 hit single "Big City Life", they won the Sopot International Song Festival in 2006.

Biography
Marlon Rosegold McVey-Roudette was born in London and is the son of Cameron McVey, a British music producer, and Vonnie Roudette, a designer and artist from Saint Vincent and the Grenadines. As a young child, he moved with his mother and sister to St. Vincent, where he began his music career before returning to London when he was 18. Preetesh Hirji was born in London of dual-Indian parentage and grew up in the heart of West London, where he started at Eastcote Studios on Kensal Road.

Signs of a Struggle (2005–2006)
Mattafix released their first single, "11.30 (Dirtiest Trick in Town)", as a limited edition on Buddhist Punk Records on 13 January 2005. However, the song never charted.

Their second single, "Big City Life", was released by EMI on 8 August 2005. 
It was a considerable hit, managing number 15 in their native United Kingdom and number 1 in Germany, Poland, Austria, Italy, Switzerland and New Zealand.
It also had considerable success in other countries, including top-20 positions in France, Australia, and Belgium. It can also be heard on the soundtrack to the hit video game 2006 FIFA World Cup Germany, designed by EA Sports. "Big City Life" also received multiple popular remixes over the ensuing decades, including notable remixes by LEEX, Luude, and Sam Jonsson; the Luude remix, released in 2022, has amassed 15.8 million streams on Spotify alone (compared to 118.4 million Spotify streams for the original) as of August 2022.

Signs of a Struggle received positive reviews and had success in Europe where the band toured extensively throughout 2006–08.
Signs of a Struggle was a Triple J feature album in April 2006.

The duo toured with the likes of Jem and Joss Stone on their UK tours to promote the album, and have also opened for Sting, in Milan, before a crowd of more than 100,000 people.

Their fourth single, "To & Fro", was released on 13 March 2006. The single was released as a download only in the United Kingdom.

Rhythm & Hymns (2007–2009)
On 7 September 2007, Mattafix released "Living Darfur", the first single taken from their second album Rhythm & Hymns. It was available as a download only.
The single was released physically on 22 October 2007. The video features Matt Damon in the intro.
The track was featured as part of the Save Darfur Campaign. Working alongside humanitarian agencies operating in the region, the band filmed a video for the song in the refugee camps in the region. The video became extremely popular on YouTube and to date is the only music video by an international group to be filmed in a war zone.

Speaking in June 2008 to English R&B writer Pete Lewis of Blues & Soul, Roudette explained the musical background to Rhythms & Hymns: "With this album I wanted to bring through more aspects of the live show, which is something maybe the first album lacked. You know, we do go out with a seven or eight-piece band, and that has become a big part of the Mattafix sound. So, in addition to keeping the hardcore element and programmed beats from last time round, with Rhythms & Hymns we've also used a lot of live drums. Also, we've added quite a lot of influences that we got from the road. Particularly in places like Johannesburg, where we played a couple of great shows."

The album was released on 23 November 2007 in most European countries. In Australia, it was released on 17 November 2007.

Mattafix remixed Lady Gaga's song "Eh Eh (Nothing Else I Can Say)". Their remix appears on her iTunes Remix EP; however, it is not on the UK version.

Separation and Roudette solo career (2010–present)

In April 2010, Marlon Roudette made a video appearance where he spoke about recording and making the record in his home-based studio. However, via Facebook, it was announced that Roudette and Hirji had gone separate ways, due to their different new ideas for future projects, which has brought abundant attention to fans. He is yet to come up with his new artist name; whether to stay with the name Mattafix, or choose a new stage name; perhaps his own. "Mattafix presents...Marlon..." was a quote from a late 2010 YouTube video, as an updated possibility for his album title and/or stage name. Marlon Roudette has confirmed that the new album is "not a radical shift but definitely different. More instrumentation and more in depth musical compositions." Marlon Roudette has stated that the album is pretty much completed, but the album is still being "fine tuned". His first solo album Matter Fixed was released on 2 September 2011. His sophomore effort, Electric Soul, was released on 8 August 2014.

Awards and nominations
{| class="wikitable sortable plainrowheaders" 
|-
! scope="col" | Award
! scope="col" | Year
! scope="col" | Nominee(s)
! scope="col" | Category
! scope="col" | Result
! scope="col" class="unsortable"| 
|-
! scope="row"|Eska Music Awards
| 2006
| "Big City Life"
| Best International Hit
| 
| 
|-
!scope="row" rowspan=2|Hungarian Music Awards
| 2006
| rowspan=2|Signs of a Struggle
| Best Foreign Rap or Hip-Hop Album
| 
| 
|-
| 2007
| Best Foreign Dance Album
| 
|

Discography

Albums

Singles

Music videos

References

External links
 http://www.mattafix.com/ Official website (archived)

Sopot International Song Festival winners
English electronic music duos
English hip hop groups
Hip hop duos
Musical groups established in 2005
Musical groups disestablished in 2010
Dancehall groups